Cordiform may refer to

Cordiform leaf, a type of leaf morphology
Cordiform projection, a map projection 
Cordiform axe, a type of Lower Paleolithic hand axe